The Bronx is The Bronx's second LP and the first recording by the band on a major label, Island Def Jam. Released on July 18, 2006, it is the band's second eponymous album and has a change in musical style. It was leaked online on April 26, 2006, almost two months before it was released on vinyl LP.

The album was named best album of the year by Rock Sound magazine and was in Spin magazine's list of the top 40 albums of the year at number 36.

Track listing

Personnel
Jorma Vi] - drums
Matt Caughthran - vocals
Joby J. Ford - guitar
James Tweedy - bass guitar

Vinyl information
1st press : 1,000 White

References 

The Bronx (band) albums
2006 albums
Albums produced by Michael Beinhorn